Nickel hydrazine nitrate (NHN), (chemical formula: [Ni(N2H4)3](NO3)2 is an energetic material having explosive
properties in between that of primary explosive and a secondary explosive. It is a salt of a coordination compound of nickel with a reaction equation of 3N2H4·H2O + Ni(NO3)2  →〔Ni(N2H4)3〕(NO3)2 ＋ 3H2O

Preparation
NHN can be synthesized by reacting nickel(II) nitrate hexahydrate with a dilute aqueous solution of hydrazine monohydrate at 65 C. To help speed the drying of the product after filtration from the hot water, it can be rinsed with alcohol. The product is a fluffy powder (density=0.9 g/cm3). To increase its bulk density to (1.2 g/cm3), dextrin in the amount of (1%) of the weight of the nickel(II) nitrate hexahydrate can be added.

Non-primary explosive detonator (NPED) 

The sensitivity of NHN straddles the line between highly sensitive primaries and a sensitive secondary, so it can be considered a true non-primary explosive detonator (NPED).

Another benefit of NHN is that it will make the DDT (deflagration to detonation transition) in a cardboard shell, eliminating the danger of shrapnel from a metal shell.

Safety
NHN straddles the line between primary and secondary.  Because of this it is a relatively safe explosive to work with having 80x less sensitivity to friction (16.0 N) than Lead Azide (0.1N) as shown in table 2.

Friction sensitivities of some traditional explosives (lead azide – 0.1N; lead trinitroresorcinate – 1.5 N; mercury fulminate (white) – 5.0 N;
tetrazene – 8.0 N; PETN – 60 N; hexogen – 120 N; octogen – 120 N, show that NHN is not very sensitive, and is thereby not exceedingly hazardous in handling.

Table 1. General and structural properties of Nickel hydrazine nitrate

a Values in brackets are theoretical

Table 2. Comparative properties of Nickel hydrazine nitrate, lead azide and lead styphnate

a Experimental value, b literature value, and c theoretical value

References

Explosives
Nickel compounds
Hazardous materials
Hydrazines
Nitrates
Detonators